775 Lumière is a minor planet orbiting the Sun.  The apparent magnitude is 10.40.  The diameter is 33.58 kilometers.  Its rotational period is 6.103 hours, and the albedo is .108.  The name honors Auguste and Louis Lumiere and the company making photographic film for astronomers in France.

References

External links
 
 

Eos asteroids
Lumiere
Lumiere
Auguste and Louis Lumière
S-type asteroids (Tholen)
19140106